Blue Lick is an unincorporated community located in Lincoln County, Kentucky, United States.

Famous residents

The parents of Red Foley kept a general store at the crossroads of Blue Lick. A guitar once used as part-payment for settlement of an account was given to Foley, starting him on a musical path which would eventually see him inducted into the Country Music Hall of Fame.

References

Unincorporated communities in Lincoln County, Kentucky
Unincorporated communities in Kentucky